Nové Mesto nad Váhom District is a district in the Trenčín Region of western Slovakia. Before 1920, the territory of the district was mostly part of the county of Kingdom of Hungary of Nyitra, with an area in the north forming part of the county of Trencsén.

Municipalities

References

External links 
Official site

Districts of Slovakia
Trenčín Region